Kinesin-like protein KIF14 is a protein that in humans is encoded by the KIF14 gene.

References

Further reading